The 2010–11 Los Angeles Kings season was the 44th season of operation (43rd season of play) for the National Hockey League (NHL) franchise.

Off-season

Pre-season

Regular season 
The Kings came out on fire to start the season, and took the lead in the Western Conference standings. Despite an injury to Drew Doughty, the team started with a 12–3 win–loss record into November, including a six-game win streak.

The Kings concluded the regular season having tied the New Jersey Devils for the fewest power-play goals allowed, with 40.

Standings

Divisional standings

Conference standings

Schedule and results

2010–11 Kings schedule at nhl.com

Playoffs
The Kings returned to the playoffs for the second consecutive season.

Legend:

Player statistics

Skaters

Goaltenders 

†Denotes player spent time with another team before joining Kings. Stats reflect time with the Kings only.
‡Traded mid-season.
Bold/italics denotes franchise record.
Underline denotes currently with a minor league affiliate.

Awards and records

Records 
Anze Kopitar established a franchise record for most consecutive games played. On March 14, 2011, Kopitar established the new mark by playing in a 325th consecutive game against the Nashville Predators. The previous record was held by Hockey Hall of Fame member Marcel Dionne. Dionne played in 324 straight contests between January 7, 1978, until January 9, 1982. Jonathan Quick became the first goaltender in franchise history to post consecutive 30-win seasons.

Milestones

Awards

Transactions 
The Kings have been involved in the following transactions during the 2010–11 season.

Trades

Notes

Free agents acquired

Free agents lost

Acquired via waivers

Lost via waivers

Player signings

Draft picks 
Los Angeles' picks at the 2010 NHL Entry Draft in Los Angeles, California.

Farm teams 
The Kings have one American Hockey League (AHL) affiliate in the Manchester Monarchs. They also have one ECHL affiliate in the Ontario Reign. Both the Monarchs and the Reign are owned in part by the Kings' parent company, Anschutz Entertainment Group.

References

External links 
2010–11 Los Angeles Kings season at ESPN
2010–11 Los Angeles Kings season at Hockey Reference

Los Angeles Kings seasons
Los Angeles Kings season, 2010-11
Los
LA Kings
LA Kings